University student retention, sometimes referred to as persistence, is a process to try to improve graduation rates and decrease a loss of tuition revenue via programs such via peer pressure, student academic programs, counselor and faculty monitoring, and financial and academic support. Put simply, schools measure the student retention rate as the number of students who re-enroll from one year to the next. The topic is also considered to be of importance to students, who invest their time and resources in the hope of earning a degree.

In United States

Transfer rates 
Transfer rates are very high in the United States with 60% of all bachelor's degrees being awarded to students that began their college at another institution.  Some transfers are planned; many community colleges have articulation agreements with four-year colleges. Other university systems have so-called feeder schools offering the first two years of the degree at a local campus with transfer into the flagship university in the junior year.

Factors affecting persistence

Grades 
Grades earned in a student's first semester are a very strong predictor of student persistence. For example, in a longitudinal study of Purdue engineering students by Budny et al, it was shown that first semester GPA was a better predictor of retention than SAT scores. Also, first semester engineering students who earn an A grade in Precalculus have the same persistence after 6 semesters as students whose first semester mathematics course was Calculus I and who earned a B, and these levels of persistence are also equivalent to students whose first semester course was Calculus II, and who earned a grade of C. A second study on the role of grades in first semester coursework supports the importance of first semester GPA, showing that the grade earned in English and mathematics courses are a strong predictor of persistence after one year, with the strongest predictor of returning corresponding to earning a grade of "A" in English, and the next strongest predictors corresponding to earning a "B" in English, or an "A" or "B" in mathematics. The level of course taken (for example, whether Calculus I or Precalculus) is less of a predictor of persistence at university than the grade earned in the mathematics class taken. This consideration is important for students who might, for example, have earned a passing AP Calculus AB score of "3" (as opposed to a higher score). For STEM majors that rely on Calculus I as a prerequisite, (e.g. engineering, physics and chemistry majors), these students with an AP AB score of "3" might consider retaking Calculus I their first semester at university and earning a high grade while also solidifying their calculus knowledge, and then taking Calculus II in their second semester.

Cost of tuition 
The economy also has a noticeable effect on retention rates. In general, tuition has been steadily climbing at universities since the mid-1980s.  The cost of public and private institutions in the 1999–2000 school year, which includes tuition and on campus housing, averaged $7,302 and $20,277, respectively. After adjusting for inflation, this represented a 22% cost increase at public institutions and a 27% increase at private institutions for the 10-year period between the 1989–1990 and 1999–2000 academic years. This rise in cost has made it difficult for many students and their families to pay for college. According to the National Center for Public Policy and Higher Education, tuition at a 4-year college represented 12% of the total income for families that fell into the lowest income bracket in 1980, and rose drastically to encompass 25% of their income by 2000. This has created an influx of part-time students and working students. In the undergraduate population, 50% of students describe themselves as working primarily to pay for their education at an average of 25 hours per week. This leaves working students little time to become involved on campus and actively participate in university life. Indeed, working-class students, who spend more time in paid employment, are significantly less integrated into university life than middle-class students. In spite of all of the programs and services to help retain students, according to the U.S. Department of Education, National Center for Educational Statistics, only 50% of those who enter higher education actually earn a bachelor's degree. Though research is still needed in this area, it is becoming clear that there may be a link between the increased amount of working students and declining retention rates. 

Additional counseling is often available for financial issues.  Private counseling and private tutoring are other options for students.

Addressing student retention 
Universities are now creating a number of new programs for students that help keep them engaged in their classes and involved on campus. This includes campus funded tutoring, freshman seminar courses, and intramural sports among many other things. These programs are important when it comes to campus life because it has been shown that student involvement is directly related to student success. When a student participates, they form both social and emotional ties to the university that both encourage the student to do well academically and reduce the chance that the student will drop out of school entirely or leave for another university.

Private corporations are looking into the business of student retention as a potential new field of revenue. This has led to problematic outsourcing strategies, such as the case of the University of Texas' system $10 million investment into the private company Myedu. Data on the amount of corporate lobbying addressed to the Board of Regents of State Universities is not available.

At the same time, there is a great deal that administrators at the school and college level as well as faculty at the course level can do to improve student retention. For instance, in online courses where attrition has been reported even higher than in traditional face-to-face courses, faculty can strive to make connections and meet the needs of individual students.

See also
 Alexander Astin
 Vince Tinto, a noted theorist in the field

References

University and college students
Higher education